Scot Gardner is an Australian writer known for his young adult novels. He has worked as a counselor and youth worker before becoming a full-time novelist.

Bibliography

"I’m not exactly sure how I ended up a writer. I wanted to be a veterinarian when I was at school, but I did work experience as a vet and it was nothing like I’d imagined." - Scot Gardner 
One Dead Seagull (2001)
White Ute Dreaming (2002)
Burning Eddy (2003) 
The Legend of Kevin the Plumber (2004)
Kite Dude (2004)
Gravity (2006)
The Other Madonna (2007)
One Wheel Drive (2007)
The Lost King (2008)
The Detachable Boy (2008)
Bookmark Days (2009)
The Detachable Boy: With One Loose Foot (2010) 
Happy As Larry (2010)
The Dead I Know (2011)
The Way We Roll (2016)
Sparrow (2017)
Changing Gears (2018)
Off the Map (2020)

Critical studies and reviews
 Review of The dead I know.

References

External links

Australian writers
Living people
Year of birth missing (living people)